Thank You for Your Servitude: Donald Trump's Washington and the Price of Submission is a 2022 book by Mark Leibovich on relations within the United States Republican Party during the Trump administration.

References

External links 

 

2022 non-fiction books
English-language books
Penguin Press books
Books about the Trump administration
Books about the Republican Party (United States)